Muppavarapu (ముప్పవరపు) is a family name/surname/lastname of the Telugu-speaking people in India.

Notable people bearing the name include:

Muppavarapu Venkaiah Naidu, BJP politician

Indian surnames